Narciso Alberto Amador Leal (29 October 1951 – 27 December 2020) was a Mexican politician affiliated with the Institutional Revolutionary Party.  he served as Deputy of the LX Legislature of the Mexican Congress representing Puebla.

Leal died from COVID-19 on 27 December 2020.

References

1951 births
2020 deaths
Politicians from Puebla
Institutional Revolutionary Party politicians
21st-century Mexican politicians
Instituto Politécnico Nacional alumni
20th-century Mexican politicians
Members of the Congress of Puebla
Deaths from the COVID-19 pandemic in Mexico
People from Huauchinango
Deputies of the LX Legislature of Mexico
Members of the Chamber of Deputies (Mexico) for Puebla